KTGS (The Gospel Station Network) (88.3 FM) is a radio station in Ada, Oklahoma; licensed to nearby Tishomingo. The station is currently owned by local pastor Randall Christy and his company, South Central Oklahoma Christian Broadcasting.

The flagship of The Gospel Station network, KTGS broadcasts a southern gospel format.

They play southern gospel music from artists like The Gaither Vocal Band, Karen Peck & New River, Ernie Haase & Signature Sound, Triumphant Quartet, The Crabb Family, Greater Vision, Jeff & Sheri Easter, The Kingsmen, The Nelons, The Isaacs, plus they play lots of classic songs and artists such as The Hinsons, The Happy Goodmans, The Cathedrals, and more.

Stations
In addition to KTGS, The Gospel Station Network airs on 9 additional full powered stations and 6 low powered translators. The bulk of its network is located in Oklahoma, and spreads across portions of the Tulsa, Oklahoma City, and Lawton markets. With stations that also cover Wichita Falls, Paris, and Amarillo, Texas.

Low powered translators

K261CR/K297BB/K268BR rebroadcasts KUCO-HD2.
K284BH rebroadcasts KBZD-HD4.

History
This station was assigned call sign KAZC on December 8, 1997, changing to KTGS on November 1, 2008.

References

External links
thegospelstation.com

TGS
Southern Gospel radio stations in the United States
Radio stations established in 1997